Francis Scott Key Fitzgerald  (September 24, 1896 – December 21, 1940) was an American author of novels and short stories, whose works are the paradigmatic writings of the Jazz Age. He is widely regarded as one of the greatest American writers of the 20th century. Fitzgerald is considered a member of the "Lost Generation" of the 1920s. He finished four novels: This Side of Paradise, The Beautiful and Damned, The Great Gatsby (his most famous), and Tender Is the Night. A fifth, unfinished novel, The Last Tycoon, was published posthumously. Fitzgerald also wrote many short stories that treat themes of youth and promise along with age and despair.

Books

Novels

Short story collections 

{| class="wikitable"
|+
|-
! Title !! Publication !! Contents !! E-text
|-
! colspan="4"| During Fitzgerald lifetime 
|-
| Flappers and Philosophers || Scribners, 1920 || 8 short stories: || Read; Read
|-
| Tales of the Jazz Age || Scribners, 1922 || 11 short stories: || Read; Read
|-
| All the Sad Young Men || Scribners, 1926 || 9 short stories: || Read
|-
| Taps at Reveille || Scribners, 1935 || 18 short stories; || 
|-
! colspan="4"| Posthumous
|-
| The Stories of F. Scott Fitzgerald || Scribners, 1951 || 28 short stories, 10 not previously collected and 4 sets of editorial notes || Read 
|-
| Babylon Revisited and Other Stories ||  Scribners, 1960 || 10 short stories;  || 
|-
| The Pat Hobby Stories || Scribners, 1962 || All 17 short stories about the fictional screenwriter Pat Hobby || Read
|-
| The Apprentice Fiction of F. Scott Fitzgerald || Rutgers University Press, 1965 || 16 early stories || Read
|-
| The Basil and Josephine Stories || Scribners, 1973 || 14 short stories;9 about Basil and 5 about Josephine:  | Read
|-
| Bits of Paradise || Scribners, 1974 ||  21 stories by Fitzgerald and his wife Zelda by F. Scott: "The Popular Girl", "Love in the Night", "A Penny Spent", "The Dance", "Jacobs Ladder", "The Swimmers", "The Hotel Child", "A New Leaf", "What a Handsome Pair!", "Last Kiss", "Dearly Beloved"by Zelda: "The Original Follies Girl", "Southern Girl", "The Girl the Prince Liked", "The Girl with Talent", "A Millionaire's Girl", "Poor Working Girl", "Miss Ella", "The Continental Angle", "A Couple of Nuts"Scott and Zelda: "Our Own Movie Queen" || Read 
|-
| The Price Was High: The Last Uncollected Stories || Harcourt, 1979 || 50 short stories, with individual editorial notes ||  Read
|-
| The Short Stories of F. Scott Fitzgerald || Scribners, 1989 || all available in earlier collections || 
|-
| I'd Die For You: And Other Lost Stories || Simon & Schuster, April 2017 || 18 stories, scenarios and fragments || 
|}

 Other books 

 Letters 

 Short stories 
 1909–1919 

 1920–1924 

 1925–1929 

 1930–1934 

 1935–1940 

 Posthumously 

 Cambridge Edition 
Cambridge University Press published the complete works of F. Scott Fitzgerald in annotated editions.

 The Great Gatsby
 The Great Gatsby (1991) | 
 Trimalchio: An Early Version of The Great Gatsby (2000) | 
 The Great Gatsby: An Edition of the Manuscript (2018) | 
 The Great Gatsby: A Variorum Edition (2019) | 

 Other Books 
 The Love of the Last Tycoon: A Western (1993) | 
 This Side of Paradise (1996) 
 Flappers and Philosophers (1999) | 
 Tales of the Jazz Age (2002) | 
 My Lost City: Personal Essays, 1920–1940 (2005) | 
 All The Sad Young Men (2007) | 
 The Beautiful and Damned (2008) | 
 The Lost Decade: Short Stories from Esquire, 1936–1941 (2008) | 
 The Basil, Josephine, and Gwen Stories (2009) | 
 Spires and Gargoyles: Early Writings, 1909–1919 (2010) | 
 Tender Is the Night (2012) | 
 Taps at Reveille (2014) | 
 A Change of Class (2016) | 
 Last Kiss (2017) | 

 Adaptations 

Film
 1922: The Beautiful and Damned, with Marie Prevost and Kenneth Harlan. The silent film is considered as lost.
 1926: The Great Gatsby, with Warner Baxter, Lois Wilson, Neil Hamilton, Hale Hamilton, William Powell, Georgia Hale, and Carmelita Geraghty. The silent film is considered as lost.
 1949: The Great Gatsby, with Alan Ladd, Betty Field, Macdonald Carey, Barry Sullivan, Howard Da Silva, Shelley Winters, and Ruth Hussey.
 1962: Tender Is the Night, with Jennifer Jones, Jason Robards, Jr., Joan Fontaine, and Tom Ewell. The film was nominated for an Academy Awards.
 1974: The Great Gatsby, with Robert Redford, Mia Farrow, Sam Waterston, Bruce Dern, Scott Wilson, Karen Black, and Lois Chiles. The film won two Academy Awards.
 1976: The Last Tycoon, with Robert de Niro, Tony Curtis, Robert Mitchum, Jack Nicholson, Donald Pleasence, Jeanne Moreau, Theresa Russell, and Ingrid Boulting. The film was nominated for an Academy Awards.
 2008: The Curious Case of Benjamin Button, with Brad Pitt, Cate Blanchett, Taraji P. Henson, Mahershala Ali, and Tilda Swinton. The film received thirteen Academy Award nominations, the most of the 81st Academy Awards, including for Best Picture. It won three Academy Award.
 2013: The Great Gatsby, with Leonardo Di Caprio, Carey Mulligan, Tobey Maguire, Joel Edgerton, Jason Clarke, Isla Fisher, Elizabeth Debicki, and Amitabh Bachchan. The film won two Academy Awards.

Television

 1955: The Diamond as Big as the Ritz, a television film, broadcast on Kraft Theatre, with Lee Remick and Elizabeth Montgomery.
 1957: The Last Tycoon, an episode of the anthology series Playhouse 90, with Peter Strauss, Mary Steenburgen, and Sean Young.
 1985: Tender Is the Night, a television series, with Mary Steenburgen and Peter Strauss.
 2000: The Great Gatsby, a television film, broadcast on the BBC, with Toby Stephens, Mira Sorvino, Paul Rudd, Martin Donovan, Bill Camp, Heather Goldenhersh, and Francie Swift.
 2016–2017: The Last Tycoon, a television series, with Matt Bomer, Kelsey Grammer, Lily Collins, Dominique McElligott, Enzo Cilenti, Koen De Bouw, Mark O'Brien, and Rosemarie DeWitt. The series was nominated for three Primetime Emmy Awards.

Opera
 1999: The Great Gatsby,  composed by John Harbison.

 Lost manuscripts 
In 2004, the University of South Carolina purchased a newly discovered cache of 2,000 pages of screenplay work that Fitzgerald wrote for MGM while in Hollywood. The cache demonstrates that Fitzgerald put considerable effort into his attempts at screenwriting during his final years. He 
approached each screenplay assignment by MGM as if it were a novel, and he wrote extensive back-stories for every character before typing a single word of dialogue. Despite these herculean efforts, the studio nonetheless found his work unsatisfactory and chose not to renew his contract.

In 2015, The Strand Magazine published an 8,000-word lost manuscript by Fitzgerald entitled "Temperature", dated July 1939. Long thought lost, the manuscript was found by a researcher in Princeton's archives. The story recounts the illness and decline of an alcoholic writer among Hollywood idols in Los Angeles while suffering lingering fevers and indulging in light-hearted romance with a Hollywood actress. Two years later, Scribner's published a rediscovered cache of Fitzgerald's short stories in a collection titled I'd Die For You''.

Notes

Works cited

External links
 F. Scott Fitzgerald Papers at Princeton University
 Annotated Bibliography—at Scott-Fitzgerald.com
 

Bibliographies by writer